Scoparia fumata is a species of moth in the family Crambidae. It is endemic in New Zealand.

Taxonomy

It was described by Alfred Philpott in 1915. However the placement of this species within the genus Scoparia is in doubt. As a result, this species has also been referred to as Scoparia (s.l.) fumata.

Description

The wingspan is 20–23 mm. The forewings are pale fuscous-brown with dark fuscous markings. The hindwings are grey, tinged with ochreous and with a darker subterminal line. Adults have been recorded on wing in December.

References

Moths described in 1915
Moths of New Zealand
Scorparia
Endemic fauna of New Zealand
Endemic moths of New Zealand